The first recorded history of Jews in Kraków, Poland dates back to the 13th century. Jews began to own land and homes in their quarter and in neighboring quarters of the city in 1312.

The city was an important scholarly center during the Golden Age of Polish Jewry (c. 1500-1648) and was home to prominent rabbis such as Rabbi Joel Sirkes (1561-1640), known as the "Bach" after his halachic work (published 1631-1640); and Rabbi Moses Isserles (1530-1572/82), author of the Mapah, glosses on the Shulchan Aruch of Rabbi Joseph Caro. Even after the events of 1648-1649 the city remained a Jewish center until the Holocaust. Rabbis included Rabbi Samuel Ehrenfeld (1835-1883), known as the Chassan Sofer. During the Nazi occupation, most of the 68,000 Jews of Krakow were expelled from the city (1940), 15,000 remained in the Kraków Ghetto until 1943 when they were deported to Belzec extermination camp, where they were murdered.

See also 
 Kazimierz
 History of the Jews in Poland

References 

 
Kraków
Kraków